William C. "Whitey" Thomas (August 17, 1895 – August 1978) was an American football end. He played for the Frankford Yellow Jackets in 1924 in the National Football League and for the Philadelphia Quakers in 1926 in the first American Football League. Thomas also played for the Yellow Jackets in 1922 and in 1923, before the team became members of the NFL. He played college football for Penn State, before playing professionally.

During Whitey's final season of professional football in 1927, he played for the Atlantic City Roses. During a 6-0 loss to the Staten Island Stapletons, he caught four passes for 101 yards.

Sources
Statistics
Frankford Yellow Jackets Pre-NFL

Notes

1895 births
1978 deaths
Sportspeople from Atlantic City, New Jersey
American football tight ends
Players of American football from Pennsylvania
Penn State Nittany Lions football players
Frankford Yellow Jackets players
Philadelphia Quakers (AFL) players